Inčukalns Parish is an administrative unit of Sigulda Municipality, Latvia. From 2009 until 2021, it was part of Inčukalns Municipality.

References 

 

Parishes of Latvia
Sigulda Municipality
Vidzeme